This was a new event to the ITF Women's Circuit.

Chinese duo Xu Shilin and You Xiaodi won the inaugural title, defeating the top seeds Irina Khromacheva and Emily Webley-Smith in the final, 3–6, 6–2, [10–4].

Seeds

Draw

References 
 Draw

Zhuhai ITF Women's Pro Circuit - Doubles
Zhuhai Open